Puthige Matha (Kannada: ಪುತ್ತಿಗೆ ಮಠ) or Puttige Mutt in some records and literature is a Madhwa Vaishnava monastery. It is one of the Ashta Mathas of Udupi founded by Dvaita philosopher Madhvacharya of Udupi. The first pontiff of Puttige matha was Sri Upendra Tirtha, who was a direct disciple of Sri Madhvacharya, the founder of the Dvaita school of philosophy.  The main idols worshipped in the Puttige matha are that of Panduranga (Vittala), which was given to Sri Upendra Tirtha by Sri Madhvacharya.  Till date, there have been 29 pontiffs who have headed the matha.

The current Swamiji of the matha is Shri Sugunendra Tirtha Swamiji

The Lineage of Swamiji's (guru parampara) 

 Upendra Tirtha-Sri Madhwavijaya mentions a story of Sri Upendra teeertha.  Sri Madhva undertook a second trip to Badari.  On the way, many interesting incidents took place.  Once, after Sri Madhva and his followers crossed the Ganga river, the troops of a Muslim ruler arrested all of them.  Sri Madhva explained to the King that it was the same Supreme Being that all people on earth worshipped and therefore he feared none.  Looking at the fearless saint and impressed by his words, the King offered many gifts to Sri Madhva (all of which were politely refused) and permitted them to leave. On another occasion, a band of dacoits attacked the party.  Sri Madhva asked Upendra Tirtha, his disciple, to confront them.  Sri Upendra Tirtha, who went on to become one of the eight disciples who got the opportunity of worshipping Sri Krishna at Udupi, and who is the founder of the Puttige Matha, fought like a man possessed and drove away the bandits. 
 Kavindra Tirtha
 Hamsendra Tirtha
 Yadavendra Tirtha
 Dharanidhara Tirtha
 Damodara Tirtha
 Raghunatha Tirtha
 Shreevatsanka Tirtha
 Gopinatha Tirtha
 Ranganatha Tirtha
 Lokanatha Tirtha
 Ramanatha Tirtha-
 Shreevallabha Tirtha- jnAnavairAgyabhaktyAdiguNapuShpArchitAchyutAn| shrIvallabhAkhyayOgIndrAn naumyahaM tatkRupAbalaH|
 Shreenivasa Tirtha- Puthige mutt guruparampara shloka describes him as "Vadirajamunisupriyam".  His disciple's Shreenidheeya tippani on Nyaayasudha describes that his Vidyaguru had Narasimha's grace shrInivAsapadAMbhOjayugalAsakta mAnasAn| shrInivAsAkhyahaMsEMdrAn naumyahaM buddhishuddhayE|
Shreenidhi Tirtha-He has written commentary on nyaaya sudha written by jayateertha
 Gunanidhi Tirtha
 Anandanidhi Tirtha
 Taponidhi Tirtha
 Yadavendra Tirtha
 Kavindra Tirtha- There were two pillars opposite to each other on which a lion and an elephant was carved. The villagers of puthige village were in trouble. Lord Ganesha came out of the pillar on which elephant was carved hearing to prayers of Kavindra teertha. 
 Raghavendra Tirtha-He laid steps for Madhvasarovara in Udupi Sri Krishna Mutt.  His brindavana is in Hiriyadka, Puthige.  Lakshmidhara teertha of Shiroor mutt was his brother in poorvashrama. 
 Vibudhendra Tirtha
 Surendra Tirtha
Bhuvanendra Tirtha-His brindavana is at Kuruvalli in teerthahalli.  He has been mentioned in Vishvapriyavilaasa written by kochi rangappacharya. He had done sudha mangala for 12 times.  He renovated Ananteshvara temple in Udupi.  He had many sanyasi shishyaru like Yogindra teertharu of puthige mutt, Vidyadheesha teertharu of Krishnapura mutt, Rajendra yatigalu, etc.   of his Panditya, puthige matha got jahgeer at Teerthahalli. His disciple Rajendra yatigaLu entered brindavana before Bhuvanendra Tirtha. So he gave ashrama to Yogindra teertha. 
 Yogindra Tirtha
Sumatindra Tirtha
Shatayushi Sudhindra tirtha- Sri Sudheendra Teertha took ashrama from Sri Vidyadheesha Teertha of Krishnapura Mutt and ruled the peetha for 79 years. He was born in the year 1856 at Hejamadi Village belonging to Shukla Yajurveda Shakha. He took Sanyasa in 1878. He got his initial education under Sri Vidyadheesha Teertha of Krishnapura Mutt and later studied sudha and other higher education under Sri Lakshmivallabha Teertha of Shiroor Mutt. 
Sujnanendra teertha
Sugunendra Tirtha (Present Pitadhipathi)
 Sushreendra Tirtha (Junior Pontiff)

Branches & Temples Managed by Shri Puthige Matha 

 Shri Puthige Vidyapeetha, Hiriyadka, Udupi
 Shri Puthige Matha, Car Street, Udupi
 Shri Puthige Vidyapeetha, Paadigar, Udupi
 Shri Puthige Matha, Theerthahalli
 Shri Govardhanagiri Kshetra, Basavanagudi, Bengaluru
 Vishnumurthy Temple, Hiriyadka, Udupi
 Anantheshwara Chandreshwara Temple, Car Street, Udupi
 Gourishankara Temple, Theerthahalli
 Shri Mahalingeshwara Temple, Hejamadi 
 Vishnumurthy Temple, Karamballi
 Ananthapadmanabha Temple, Paniyadi
 Shri Guru Raghavendra Matha, Hosanagara
 Vittala Anjeneya Raghavendra Matha, Habbuvada, Karwar
 Shri Karaanjaneya Swamiji Matha, Mailapur, Chennai
 Raghavendra Swami Matha, Darmapuri, Tamil Nadu
 Shri Krishna Hanuman Gurusarva Bhouma Sannidhi, Kolkata
 Subramanya Raghavendra Swami Matha, Taamram, Chennai
 Kemmundel Primary School, Udupi. 
Sri Hejamadi Mahalingeshvara temple, Hejamadi

International Centers 

 Shri Krishna Vrundavana, New Jersey
215 May Street
Edison, NJ 08837
United States

 Shri Venkata Krishna Kshetra, Arizona
615 S Beck Ave
Tempe, AZ 85281
United States

 Shri Venkata Krishna Temple, Los Angeles
2770, Borchar Road
Thousand Oaks, New Bury Park
Los Angeles, CA 91320
United States

 Shri Krishna Vrundavana, Texas
10223 #A Synott Rd
Sugar Land, TX 77498
United States

 Shri Krishna Vrundavana Temple, San Jose
43, Sunol Street
San Jose, CA 95126
United States

 Shri Krishna Vrundavana, Atlanta
Shri Krishna Vrundavana, Atlanta
4946, Shiloh Road
Cumming, GA 30040
United States

 Shri Krishna Brundavana, Canada
3005 Islington Ave E
North York, ON M9L 2K9
North York, ON 000000
Canada

 Shri Venkata Krishna Brundavana, Melbourne
241 Poath Road
Murrumbeena VIC 3163
Australia

 Shri Krishna Brundavana, Sydney
58, Toongabbie Road
Toongabbie NSW 2146
Australia

 Venkata Krishna Vrundavana, London
36 Wembley Station Grove
London
HA04AL
United Kingdom

References 

Dvaita Vedanta
Ashta Mathas of Udupi